Darrell Willis may refer to:
Darral Willis (born 1996), American basketball player
Darryl Willis (born c. 1969), American geologist and publicist